St Paulinus’ Church, Ollerton is a Grade II listed parish church of the Church of England in Ollerton.

History

The church dates from 1931 and was built by Charles Naylor, George Hanson Sale and Joseph Alfred Woore as Naylor, Sale and Woore of Derby for the Butterley Company.

Parish status

The church is in a joint parish with 
St Matthew's Church, Boughton
St Giles' Church, Ollerton

References

Ollerton
Grade II listed churches in Nottinghamshire
Churches completed in 1931